Maira Sumbal Jaffar is a town and union council in the Islamabad Capital Territory of Pakistan. It is located at 33° 39' 41N 72° 58' 29E with an altitude of 547 metres (1797 feet). The village of Maira Sumbal Jaffar has a population of around 500.
Maira Sumbal Jaffar is UC # 39 of Isamabad and Its Villages are Maira Jaffar,  Badia Rusmat Khan, Maira Akku, Dhareek Mohri, Effaq Town.

References 

Union councils of Islamabad Capital Territory